Martti Eemil Lappalainen (11 April 1902 – 6 October 1941) was a Finnish cross-country skier and biathlete.

Biography
He was born in Liperi and was killed in action in Mäntysova, East Karelia.

Lappalainen was a part of the Military patrol for Finland that took silver in the 1924 Winter Olympics.

He won the 50 km cross-country skiing event at Holmenkollen ski festival in 1928. As a result of this victory, he became the second non-Norwegian winner of any event run up to that point, behind fellow Finn Anton Collin, who won the 50 km event in 1922.

At the 1928 Winter Olympics he finished seventh in the 18 km event and ninth in the 50 km event.

Four years later he finished fourth in the 18 km event at the 1932 Winter Olympics in Lake Placid, New York. He also participated in the 50 km event but did not finish.

At the 1934 FIS Nordic World Ski Championships in Sollefteå he won a gold in the 4 × 10 km relay and a bronze in the 18 km.

He was killed in action during World War II.

Cross-country skiing results
All results are sourced from the International Ski Federation (FIS).

Olympic Games

World Championships
 2 medals – (1 gold, 1 bronze)

References

External links
 
  - click Vinnere for downloadable pdf file 

1902 births
1941 deaths
People from Liperi
People from Kuopio Province (Grand Duchy of Finland)
Military patrol competitors at the 1924 Winter Olympics
Cross-country skiers at the 1928 Winter Olympics
Cross-country skiers at the 1932 Winter Olympics
Olympic biathletes of Finland
Olympic cross-country skiers of Finland
Olympic silver medalists for Finland
Finnish military patrol (sport) runners
Finnish male cross-country skiers
Finnish military personnel killed in World War II
Holmenkollen Ski Festival winners
FIS Nordic World Ski Championships medalists in cross-country skiing
Medalists at the 1924 Winter Olympics
Sportspeople from North Karelia
20th-century Finnish people